The Campaign of Trabzon occurred in the year 1505 when Selim I fought against the Safavids after Shah Ismail's brother led an attack against Trabzon.

Shah Ismail's brother Ebrahim set out with an army composed of 3,000 men to pillage Selim's province. Selim beat back and chased the Safavids with only 450 soldiers as far as Erzincan; he massacred many of them and seized their arms and munitions. Selim then sent a separate force to raid the western territories of the Safavids. After the battle of 1505, Shah Ismail sent an envoy to Bayezid II complaining about Selim's over-aggressive raids and demanding the return of his captured soldiers' weapons. Bayezid did not return the weapons but he did send the envoy back with gifts and promises of friendship. Selim fought against the Safavids again in 1507 and in 1510, both times defeating the Safavid forces.

References

Battles involving the Ottoman Empire
Wars involving the Ottoman Empire